Peter Brown (born May 21, 1954) is a retired American professional ice hockey defenseman. He was selected by the Atlanta Flames in the seventh round (118th overall) of the 1974 NHL Entry Draft, and was also selected by the New England Whalers in the third round (43rd overall) of the 1974 WHA Amateur Draft.

In January 1979, the Toledo Goaldiggers traded Brown to the Fort Wayne Komets in exchange for goaltender Norm LaPointe.

Awards and honors

References

External links

1954 births
Living people
AHCA Division I men's ice hockey All-Americans
American men's ice hockey defensemen
Atlanta Flames draft picks
Boston University Terriers men's ice hockey players
Dayton Gems players
Fort Wayne Komets players
New England Whalers draft picks
Springfield Indians players
Toledo Goaldiggers players
Ice hockey people from Boston